Sylke Tempel (30 May 1963 – 5 October 2017) was a German author and journalist. At the time of her death, she had been the editor-in-chief of the foreign policy magazine Internationale Politik since 2008.

Biography
Tempel was born in Bayreuth, a town in the Free State of Bavaria. She studied history, political science and Jewish studies at Ludwig Maximilian University in Munich, prior to receiving a scholarship in New York between 1989 and 1991. She gained a PhD from Bundeswehr University Munich where she served as an assistant to Michael Wolffsohn. Beginning her journalistic career in 1993, she worked in Israel as a Middle East correspondent. While there, she covered a range of events such as the Oslo I Accord, the Intifada and the assassination of Israeli Prime Minister Yitzhak Rabin in 1995. In 2003, she was a recipient of the Quadriga award.

Tempel was a reporter for the publications Profil, Facts and Der Tagesspiegel, among others. She also wrote a number of young adult novels, published by Rowohlt Berlin, a part of the company Rowohlt. Since 2008, she had been the editor-in-chief of Internationale Politik, the magazine of the German Council on Foreign Relations.

Tempel lived in Berlin with her partner. In 2017, she died in Tegel during Storm Xavier when she was struck by a falling tree. She was 54. She is buried at Friedhof Heerstraße in Charlottenburg-Wilmersdorf, Berlin.

Commemoration 
The German-Israeli Future Forum Foundation named their Sylke Tempel Fellowship under the auspices of Sigmar Gabriel and Tzipi Livni after her.

References

External links

 Sylke Tempel at Globsec

1963 births
2017 deaths
20th-century German novelists
21st-century German novelists
Accidental deaths in Germany
Bundeswehr University Munich alumni
German women academics
German women journalists
German women novelists
Ludwig Maximilian University of Munich alumni
People from Bayreuth
21st-century German women writers
20th-century German women writers